Cigaritis vulcanus, the common silverline, is a species of lycaenid or blue butterfly found in Asia. It was first described by Johan Christian Fabricius in 1775.

Description

The wingspan is 26–34 mm.

Subspecies
The subspecies of Cigaritis vulcanus are-

 Spindasis vulcanus vulcanus Fabricius, 1775 – India
 Spindasis vulcanus fusca (Moore, [1881]) – Sri Lanka
 Spindasis vulcanus javanus (Fruhstorfer, 1912) – Java
 Spindasis vulcanus tavoyana (Evans, [1925]) – Myanmar, Thailand

Distribution
These butterflies are found in Sri Lanka, India, central Thailand and Java. In India, the species has been spotted in the territories of Maharashtra, Orissa, Karnataka, Kerala, Andhra Pradesh, West Bengal, Delhi, Madhya Pradesh, Uttar Pradesh and Tamil Nadu.

Habitat
Their numbers peak during the south-west and north-east monsoons. It inhabits scrub land with sparse vegetation, hedge rows, scrub jungles and secondary forest.

Habits
They are difficult to disturb when nectaring on flowers but are able to fly fast erratically. Even when disturbed they return to the same spot a moment later. Mainly, they are found near their host plants.

Food plants 
The larvae feed on jujube, Zizyphus rugosa, Lxora longifolia, Clerodendrum siphomanthus, C. inerme, Allophylus cobbe, Ixora chinensis and Canthium parviflorum.

References

External links
 
 

Cigaritis
Fauna of Pakistan
Butterflies of Asia
Butterflies described in 1775